Hypomenia is a genus of cavibelonian  solenogasters, shell-less, worm-like marine mollusks.

References

Cavibelonia